The Kahena was a motorcycle made by the Brazilian manufacturer Paulista Machine Technique S.A., manufactured in São Paulo from 1991 to 1999.

Model-specific features
After the sale of the old Amazonas brand, former owners Luiz Gomi and José Biston together developed a new motorcycle called Kahena in 1988. In 1990 they sold the production rights to an industry in São Paulo, which manufactured the first six prototypes and presented them in 1991 at the São Paulo International Motor Show. The first models were delivered to the buyers only in 1992. From 1993 on, the Kahena was available in sport bike and sport touring configuration.

Similar to its predecessor, it also had a 1600cc engine VW do Brasil, the same used in the VW Beetle. Available in two engine configurations 65 hp at 4,600 rpm and 90 hp at 5,800 rpm. In both versions the carburetion was double Brasol 32mm, four-speed gearbox, plus the reverse gear, using Volkswagen gears.

The secondary transmission was a cardan shaft on mono cantilever scales, the brakes were double disc in the front and single disc in the rear. The front suspension had common telescopic forks, but the rear was carried by a single spring and shock absorber assembly, a large monocoque was installed in a diagonal position, attached to the inner part of the frame at the front and to the rear scale.

References

External links

Kahena LJ 1600 ST on Cycle World
Kahena 1600 ST on Motorrad

Motorcycles of Brazil
Motorcycles introduced in 1992
Sport bikes
Sport touring motorcycles